Carson Michael Talboys (born February 20, 1999) is an American soccer player who plays as a defender for Charlotte Independence in the USL League One.

Career

Youth, College & Amateur
Talboys was a two-year letter-winner at Lake Norman Charter School, and also played for the Carolina Rapids USSDA side instead of high school soccer as a junior and senior.

In 2017, Talboys attended Catawba College to play college soccer. In four years with the Indians, Talboys played in 50 games, scoring three goals and tallying a single assist. He captained the team during their 2020–21 season. Talboys transferred to Wilmington University in 2021, going on to make 21 appearances and scoring six goals. In his single season with the Wilcats, Talboys was named Third Team CoSIDA Academic All-American, Second Team United Soccer Coaches All-East Region, First Team D2CCA All-East Region, CACC Defensive Player of the Year, and First Team All-CACC.

While at college, Talboys also played in the USL League Two. He was named as part of the Charlotte Eagles roster for their 2020 season, but never appeared for the team after the season was cancelled due to the COVID-19 pandemic.

In 2022, Talboys played with North Carolina Fusion U23 in a Lamar Hunt U.S. Open Cup fixture against South Carolina United.

Professional
On April 7, 2022, Talboys signed his first professional contract, joining USL League One club Charlotte Independence. He made his professional debut the following day, starting in a 3–3 draw with Central Valley Fuego.

References

1999 births
Living people
American soccer players
Association football defenders
Charlotte Eagles players
Charlotte Independence players
North Carolina Fusion U23 players
People from Huntersville, North Carolina
Soccer players from North Carolina
USL League One players
Wilmington Wildcats men's soccer players